Andrés Gurrieri (born 3 July 1989) is a retired Argentine former professional footballer who played as a midfielder, predominantly on the right wing.

Career
Born in the Swiss city of Winterthur, he holds dual Argentine and Italian citizenship. Gurrieri began his professional career at Italian side Ternana in 2007 after progressing from the youth and reserve teams. He went on to make six appearances for the club over two seasons. He joined Terza Categoria side Colligiana on loan for the 2008–09 season, where he made 16 appearances, scoring two goals. After being released by Ternana in May 2010, Gurrieri returned to his homeland and joined Uruguayan Segunda División side Sud América. He went on to make 20 appearances for Sud América before being released in March 2011.

Whilst in Argentina, Gurrieri featured in the 2010 series of the reality show Football Cracks, under the nickname Gurry, and came 4th out of the 19 contestants.

Gurrieri joined Plymouth Argyle on trial in July 2011, but could not agree a deal due to the club being under administration at the time. He later joined Burton Albion on trial in October 2011, signing a three-month deal. He went on to sign a new contract which kept him at Burton Albion until the end of the 2011–12 season.

He returned to Plymouth Argyle on trial in the summer of 2012 and signed a 12-month contract in August to become the first South American player to represent the club. Gurrieri scored his first goal for the club in a 2–1 Football League Trophy win against Aldershot Town in October, and his first Football League goal in a 3–1 win against Rochdale eleven days later. Gurrieri left Argyle in June 2015 after choosing not to renew his contract with the Devon club.

In late July 2014, Gurrieri signed an 18-month deal with Club Social y Deportivo Tristán Suárez,  a regionalised Argentinian 3rd division side.

On 31 August 2016, he joined Sportivo Italiano, later departing the club in 2017.

References

External links

1989 births
Living people
People from Winterthur
Association football midfielders
Argentine footballers
Swiss men's footballers
Ternana Calcio players
A.S.D. Olimpia Colligiana players
Sud América players
Burton Albion F.C. players
Plymouth Argyle F.C. players
CSyD Tristán Suárez footballers
English Football League players
Sportspeople from the canton of Zürich